Ashkhen Hovakimian (Agnes Joaquim) (b. 7 April 1854, Singapore - d. 2 July 1899, Singapore) was a Singaporean Armenian who bred Singapore's first hybridised orchid hybrid, Vanda 'Miss Joaquim'.  Joaquim was inducted into the Singapore Women's Hall of Fame in 2015.

Early life
Hovakimian was the eldest daughter and second child of Parsick (Basil) Joaquim, an Armenian merchant and commercial agent, and Urelia Joaquim. Agnes was an avid gardener as was her mother. Besides her interest in gardening, Agnes was also an active member of the Armenian Church and a skilled embroiderer.

Singapore's national flower

Agnes Joaquim won prizes at annual flower shows and famously won the prize for the rarest orchid at the 1899 annual flower show. The first prize was for a hybrid that was named after her, Vanda 'Miss Joaquim'. Already suffering from cancer at the time, she died three months after receiving this prize.

In 1947, Vanda 'Miss Joaquim' was chosen as the most fitting emblem for the nascent Progressive Party. In 1957 it was chosen as the crest for the Malayan Orchid Society. But in April 1981, came the ultimate accolade. From a field of forty contenders, Vanda Miss Joaquim was selected as the national flower of Singapore.

Family

Agnes Joaquim's siblings were well known in Singapore. Narcis Street was named after her eldest brother Nerses (Narcis, born 2 December 1852). Her brothers, Joe (Joaquim, born 1 April 1856), Seth (born 11 September 1866) and John ( 17 June 1858) were well-known barristers. Joe was a founder of Braddell and Joaquim, a legal company, before founding his own firm of Joaquim Brothers. Two  brothers, Arathoon (2 July 1864), followed by Simon (5 December 1867), served as  Deputy Registrar of the Hackney Carriages Department. 

Josephine, Agnes Joaquim's grandniece, also has an orchid named after her, Vanda 'Josephine' (also known as Vanda Miss Joaquim 'Josephine').

Hovakimian's maternal grandfather, Isaiah Zachariah, was one of the members of  Singapore's first  Chamber of Commerce which met in 1837.

References

1854 births
1899 deaths
Singaporean people of Armenian descent
Floriculturists
Armenian botanists
People from Singapore
Singaporean botanists